Josué de Castro, born Josué Apolônio de Castro (5 September 1908 – 24 September 1973), was a Brazilian physician, expert on nutrition, geographer, writer, public administrator, and activist against world hunger.

His book Geopolitics of Hunger was granted The Franklin D. Roosevelt Foundation Award, in 1952. Two years later, he received the International Peace Prize.

Castro was born in Recife. He taught at the University of Brazil (today's UFRJ) and was chairman of the United Nations' Food and Agriculture Organization (FAO). He was also a member of the Brazilian parliament and a diplomat. His political rights came to an end with the military coup of 1964, when he moved to France. For many years he was president of the Association Médicale Internationale pour l’Etude des Conditions de Vie et de Santé (The International Medical Association for the Study of the Conditions of Life and Health) and member of other international organizations. He taught at Paris 8 University until his death in Paris.

Main Works

The Geography of Hunger
Ground-breaking ecological work about the political issue of hunger in Brazil. Published in 1946, the book emphasizes the socio-economic backgrounds of the biological manifestation of hunger and condemns the physical determinism.

The Geopolitics of Hunger
Originally published in the U.S. with the title "The Geography of Hunger" in 1952, translated into 26 languages, is one of the classic works on food and population. His themes are very much the opposite of those sounded by the neo-Malthusians. He does not believe that hunger is the "natural result of overpopulation," but is rather a man-made phenomenon. Even more, he undertakes to demonstrate that hunger, rather than being the result of overpopulation, is the cause of it. The work presented new formulations for underdevelopment, and was granted with The Franklin D. Roosevelt Foundation Award.

Death in the Northeast
A book that aims to strike the interest for the Northeast Brazilian people's situation. Written before military coup of 1964, and published during the military dictatorship, it clarifies the political turmoil and explosive tensions around the Brazilian agrarian system, established by feudalist Portuguese colonizers.

Of Men and Crabs
Exiled at Paris, he wrote about the scene of his childhood.

References

External links
A Coffin for Malthusianism: Josué de Castro’s Subaltern Geopolitics (article by Federico Ferretti)
The Josué de Castro Centenary (article by Malaquias Batista Filho)
Video: Josué de Castro Interview, October 1959
Radio Canada Archive: Josué de Castro, June 1960
Josué de Castro: Por Um Mundo Sem Fome
www.josuedecastro.com

1908 births
1973 deaths
Brazilian activists
Brazilian geographers
20th-century Brazilian physicians
Brazilian male writers
Academic staff of the Federal University of Rio de Janeiro
Academic staff of Paris 8 University Vincennes-Saint-Denis
Representatives of Brazil to the Food and Agriculture Organization
Officiers of the Légion d'honneur
20th-century geographers